Michael Burke (1927 – 19 November 1994) was an Irish sportsperson. He played hurling with his local club Castlegar and was a member of the Galway senior inter-county team in the 1940s and 1950s.

References

1927 births
1994 deaths
Castlegar hurlers
Galway inter-county hurlers
Connacht inter-provincial hurlers